Francis Morgan Farley (October 3, 1898 – October 11, 1988) was an American actor on the stage and in films and television.

Career
His theatrical career began in 1918 in the stage adaptation of Booth Tarkington's Seventeen. He recreated the role of Joe Bullitt in Orson Welles's Mercury Theatre on the Air adaptation of the story that aired October 16, 1938.  He gained a whole new generation of followers as a result of his guest spots on the original Star Trek series in the 1960s in the episodes "The Return of the Archons" and "The Omega Glory". In 1967 he appeared as Paco on the TV western series The Big Valley in the episode titled "Days of Grace." Morgan Farley also appeared in Barnaby Jones; episode titled, "See Some Evil...Do Some Evil" (4/8/1973).

Farley played a large number of mostly small parts in movies, television and Broadway, including the church minister in High Noon. He also served in World War II.

He was an out actor and was an activist in the early movement to gain civil and equal rights for homosexual Americans. He was a member of the board of ONE, Inc., the first public organization and publication (ONE Magazine).  His contribution is covered in a book by Joseph Hansen on ONE Magazine's main editor, Don Slater, titled A Few Doors West of Hope, published by the Homosexual Information Center. (Information on HIC can be found on the website; tangentgroup.org)

He died on October 11, 1988, eight days after his 90th birthday. His ashes were scattered in the rose garden at Valhalla Memorial Park Cemetery, North Hollywood, California.

Selected filmography

 The Love Doctor (1929) - Bud Woodbridge
 The Greene Murder Case (1929) - Rex Greene
 Half Marriage (1929) - Dickie Carroll
 The Mighty (1929) - Jerry Patterson
 Slightly Scarlet (1930) - Malatroff's Victim
 Only the Brave (1930) - Lt. Tom Wendell
 Men Are Like That (1930) - Joe Fisher
 The Devil's Holiday (1930) - Monkey McConnell
 A Man from Wyoming (1930) - Lt. Lee
 Beloved (1934) - Eric Hausmann
 Gentleman's Agreement (1947) - Resort Clerk
 You Were Meant for Me (1948) - Ticket Taker
 Open Secret (1948) - Larry Mitchell
 The Winner's Circle (1948) - Gus
 The Walls of Jericho (1948) - Proprietor
 Hollow Triumph (1948) - Howard Anderson
 MacBeth (1948) - Doctor
 Behind Locked Doors (1948) - Mr. Topper - a Patient
 Bride of Vengeance (1949) - Treasurer
 Flamingo Road (1949) - Link Niles
 Manhandled (1949) - Doc, Police Lab Man
 Special Agent (1949) - Dr. Jerome Bowen
 Abbott and Costello Meet the Killer, Boris Karloff (1949) - Gregory Milford
 Top o' the Morning (1949) - Edwin Livesley
 That Forsyte Woman (1949) - Bookseller
 Guilty of Treason (1950) - Doctor
 Barricade (1950) - The Judge
 The Man Who Cheated Himself (1950) - Rushton
 Double Crossbones (1951) - Caleb Nicholas
 Sealed Cargo (1951) - Caleb
 Goodbye, My Fancy (1951) - Doctor Pitt
 Tomorrow Is Another Day (1951) - Doctor
 The Lady from Texas (1951) - Lucian Haddon
 The Strange Door (1951) - Renville
 The Wild North (1952) - Father Simon
 Love Is Better Than Ever (1952) - Joe, Piano Player
 High Noon (1952) - Dr. Mahin - Minister
 My Wife's Best Friend (1952) - Dr. McCurran
 Angel Face (1953) - Juror
 Julius Caesar (1953) - Artemidorus
 Remains to Be Seen (1953) - Kyle Manning
 Jivaro (1954) - Vinny
 Hello, Dolly! (1969) - Workman / Onlooker
 The Barefoot Executive (1971) - Advertising Executive
 Bedknobs and Broomsticks (1971) - Old Piano Player
 Scorpio (1973)
 Soylent Green (1973) - Book #1
 At Long Last Love (1975) - Third Man
 Won Ton Ton, the Dog Who Saved Hollywood (1976) - Old Man in Back of Bus With Hat
 The Last Tycoon (1976) - Marcus
 Nickelodeon (1976) - Movie Fanatic
 Heaven Can Wait (1978) - Middleton
 Sgt. Pepper's Lonely Hearts Club Band (1978) - Old Lonely Hearts Club Band
 Dreamer (1979) - Old Timer

References

External links

1898 births
1988 deaths
People from Mamaroneck, New York
American male stage actors
American male radio actors
American male film actors
American military personnel of World War II
Burials at Valhalla Memorial Park Cemetery
20th-century American male actors
American gay actors
20th-century American LGBT people